Peter Rennert (born December 26, 1958) is a former professional tennis player from the United States. He achieved career-high rankings of World No. 40 in singles (in 1980), and World No. 8 in doubles (in 1983). At the 1977 Maccabiah Games in Israel, he and partner Joel Ross won the men's doubles gold medal, and he and Stacy Margolin won the gold medal in mixed doubles.

Biography
Rennert was born in Great Neck, New York, and is Jewish. He attended and played tennis for Great Neck North High School, and in 1976 won the singles title at the New York State Public High School Athletic Association's tennis championships.

He attended Stanford University, where he received a B.S. in Psychology and was an All-American. At Stanford, he was an NCAA singles finalist in 1980. He won three National Division 1 team titles and won College Player of the Year.

At the 1977 Maccabiah Games in Israel, he and partner Joel Ross won the men's doubles gold medal. He and Stacy Margolin won the gold medal in mixed doubles, defeating South Africa's Ilana Kloss and Graham Silverman.

Rennert enjoyed most of his tennis success while playing doubles. During his career he won two doubles titles. As a player, he trained with Harry Hopman and Wimbledon champion Tony Palafox. His best result as a singles player in a major was making it to the quarterfinals of the Australian Open twice.

Rennert now runs an awareness based Tennis curriculum business called Telos Tennis.

Career finals

Doubles (2 titles, 4 runner-ups)

References

External links
 
 

1958 births
Living people
Competitors at the 1977 Maccabiah Games
Maccabiah Games medalists in tennis
Maccabiah Games gold medalists for the United States
Jewish American sportspeople
Jewish tennis players
People from Great Neck, New York
American male tennis players
Stanford Cardinal men's tennis players
Tennis people from New York (state)
People from Easton, Connecticut
21st-century American Jews